Eupsilia sidus, the sidus sallow, is a species of cutworm or dart moth in the family Noctuidae. It is found in North America.

The MONA or Hodges number for Eupsilia sidus is 9933.1.

References

Further reading

 
 
 

Eupsilia
Articles created by Qbugbot
Moths described in 1852